Stamford Hill may refer to:

 Stamford Hill, part of the London Borough of Hackney.
 Stamford Hill, a hill near Stratton, Cornwall, the scene of battle of the English Civil War in 1643, often called the Battle of Stamford Hill.
 Stamford Hill, Durban, in South Africa.